The Coy C. Carpenter Library and Dorothy Carpenter Medical Archives, located at Wake Forest School of Medicine, is a library named after the first dean of the university's medical school, Coy Cornelius Carpenter, M.D., and his wife, Dorothy (Mitten) Carpenter.

Coy C. Carpenter was dean of the School of Medicine of Wake Forest University from 1936 to 1967 and Vice President for Health Affairs from 1963 to 1967. He guided the school through the transition from a two-year to a four-year program and the move from Wake Forest to Winston-Salem in 1941. He authored The Story of Medicine at Wake Forest University (Chapel Hill: University of North Carolina Press, 1970).

References

University and college academic libraries in the United States
Wake Forest University
Libraries in North Carolina
Medical libraries
Buildings and structures in Winston-Salem, North Carolina